1973 in the Philippines details events of note that happened in the Philippines in the year 1973.

Incumbents

 President: Ferdinand Marcos (Independent)
 Chief Justice:
Roberto Concepcion (until April 18)
Querube Makalintal (starting April 18)

Events

January
 January 10–15 – A national plebiscite referendum is held among the citizens' assemblies to ratify the new Constitution.
 January 15 – Chinese Lim Seng (Guan Suo So), upon order from Pres. Marcos on January 3, is publicly executed by firing squad in a firing range in Fort Bonifacio, Rizal for drug trafficking; the country's first execution by that method after 27 years, and only drug convict executed in the martial law era. He was charged in connection to a case wherein illegal drugs were seized in an operation in parts of Metro Manila in 1972.
January 17 – The 1973 Constitution is declared ratified, which provides the incumbent President the right to continue exercising his powers under the 1935 Constitution and the powers vested in the President and the Prime Minister under the new Constitution.
January 31 – Supreme Court decides in a case filed against Commission of Elections, that the "incumbent president of the Philippines" is Pres. Marcos, as stated in the Transitory Provisions of the 1973 Constitution.
April 24 – National Democratic Front is founded as the political arm of the Communist Party of the Philippines.
May – Masagana 99 program is launched by Pres. Marcos.

July
 July 27–28 – National referendum is held wherein 90.77% of the Citizen Assemblies voted for the ratification of the 1973 Constitution and the continuation of Martial Law, as well as continuation of Pres. Marcos' term beyond 1973.

August
August 27 – Benigno Aquino Jr. refuses to recognize the military court that will try him on various charges.

September
September 27 – Eight municipalities of Sulu are removed from its jurisdiction to create the new province of Tawi-Tawi (Presidential Decree No. 302), with Bato-Bato, Balimbing as its capital.

November
 November 22 – Old Cotabato province is divided into three new provinces: North Cotabato (with Kidapawan as its capital), Maguindanao (capital, Maganoy) and Sultan Kudarat (capital, Isulan). (PD No. 302)

December
 December 27 – Part of Zamboanga del Sur is removed from its jurisdiction to create the new province of Basilan (PD No. 356), with Isabela as its capital.

Holidays

As per Act No. 2711 section 29, issued on March 10, 1917, any legal holiday of fixed date falls on Sunday, the next succeeding day shall be observed as legal holiday. Sundays are also considered legal religious holidays. Bonifacio Day was added through Philippine Legislature Act No. 2946. It was signed by then-Governor General Francis Burton Harrison in 1921. On October 28, 1931, the Act No. 3827 was approved declaring the last Sunday of August as National Heroes Day. As per Republic Act No. 3022, April 9th was proclaimed as Bataan Day. Independence Day was changed from July 4 (Philippine Republic Day) to June 12 (Philippine Independence Day) last August 4, 1964.

 January 1 – New Year's Day
 February 22 – Legal Holiday
 April 9 – Araw ng Kagitingan (Day of Valor)
 April 19 – Maundy Thursday
 April 20 – Good Friday
 May 1 – Labor Day
 June 12 – Independence Day 
 July 4 – Philippine Republic Day
 August 13  – Legal Holiday
 August 26 – National Heroes Day
 September 21 – Thanksgiving Day
 November 30 – Bonifacio Day
 December 25 – Christmas Day
 December 30 – Rizal Day

Entertainment and culture
 July 21 – Miss Philippines Margarita Moran is the second Filipino to be crowned as Miss Universe 1973 which was held in Athens, Greece.
 November 4 – Banahaw Broadcasting Corporation began radio-television operations.

Sports
 November 18-23 – The inaugural Asian Athletics Championships is held in Marikina, Rizal.
 December 1-15 – The 1973 Asian Basketball Confederation Championship were held in Manila.

Births
January 8 – Keempee de Leon, actor, comedian, singer, songwriter and TV host
January 22 – John Apacible, actor (d. 2011)
January 23 – Epy Quizon, actor
January 30 - Michael Locsin, former actor 
January 31 – Jay Manalo, actor and model
February 7 – Angel Aquino, film and television actress
March 2 – Asi Taulava, Filipino-Tongan basketball player
March 8 – Mickey  Ferriols, Filipino actress
March 13 – Bojo Molina, actor
March 17 - Rico Blanco , musician, singer-songwriter, actor, record producer, endorser 
May 5 – Maey Bautista, actress and comedian
May 11 – Cesar Apolinario, broadcast journalist (d. 2019)
May 12 – Nancy Binay, politician
May 25 – Gelli de Belen, actress
June 14 – Pekto, actor and comedian
July 3 – Mimi Miyagi, Filipino model, pornographic actress, film director and actress
July 7 – John Lapus, actor, host, and comedian
July 19 – Diether Ocampo, actor, singer, model, and military officer
July 20 – Raymart Santiago, TV host, actor, and comedian.
September 6 – Oliver Agapito, basketball player
September 12 – Kara David, broadcast journalist
September 26 – Rovilson Fernandez, television host
December 8 – Richard Poon, singer
December 13 – Adeline Dumapong, Paralympic weightlifter.

Deaths
January 30 – Quintín Paredes, lawyer and politician (b. 1884)

See also
1973 in sports

References